The following is a list of notable electric bass guitar players. The bass guitar is a stringed instrument played primarily with the fingers (either by plucking, slapping, popping, or tapping) or using a pick. Since the 1950s, the electric bass guitar has largely replaced the double bass in popular music. Bass guitarists provide the low-pitched basslines and bass runs in many different styles of music ranging from rock and metal to blues and jazz. Bassists also use the bass guitar as a soloing instrument in jazz, fusion, Latin, funk, and in some rock styles. Musicians known mainly as guitarists are listed separately in the list of guitarists.

For double bass players, see:
 List of contemporary classical double bass players
 List of jazz bassists, which includes both double bass and electric bass players
 List of double bassists in popular music, which includes blues, folk, country, etc.

A

 Barry Adamson (Magazine, Visage, Nick Cave and the Bad Seeds)
 Paul Abrahams (The Reels)
 Gaye Advert (The Adverts)
 Pete Agnew (Nazareth)
 Martin Eric Ain (Celtic Frost, Hellhammer)
 Dominic Aitchison (Mogwai)
 Kianna Alarid (Tilly and the Wall)
 Mike de Albuquerque (Electric Light Orchestra)
 Arioch (Funeral Mist)
 Juan Alderete (Racer X, The Mars Volta)
 Miša Aleksić (Riblja Čorba)
 Dave Alexander (The Stooges)
 James Alexander (The Bar-Kays)
 Lee Alexander (Norah Jones) 
 Rustee Allen (Sly and the Family Stone)
 Merle Allin (The Murder Junkies)
 Karl Alvarez (Descendents)
 Thierry Amar (Godspeed You! Black Emperor, Thee Silver Mt. Zion Memorial Orchestra, Black Ox Orkestar)
 Jeff Ament (Pearl Jam)
 Mårten Andersson (Lizzy Borden, George Lynch)
 Mark Andes (Heart, Spirit)
 Felipe Andreoli (Angra)
 Dan Andriano (Alkaline Trio)
 Tom Angelripper (Sodom)
 Josh Ansley (Catch 22, Streetlight Manifesto, HURT)
 Michael Anthony (Van Halen, Planet Us, Sammy Hagar and the Waboritas, Chickenfoot)
 Daniel Antonsson (Dark Tranquillity)
 Tom Araya (Slayer)
 Doug Ardito (Puddle of Mudd)
 Jennifer Arroyo (Kittie)
 Reginald Arvizu (Korn, L.A.P.D.)
 Brent Ashley (Combichrist, Violent New Breed)
 Talena Atfield (Kittie)
 Melissa Auf der Maur (Hole, The Smashing Pumpkins, Auf Der Maur)
 Eric Avery (Jane's Addiction, Alanis Morissette)
 John Avila (Oingo Boingo)
 Kevin Ayers (Soft Machine)
 Pedro Aznar (Serú Girán, Pat Metheny Group)

B

 Bob Babbitt (The Funk Brothers, MFSB)
 Matt Bachand (Act of Defiance)
 Johnny Bacolas (Alice N' Chains, Second Coming)
 Pat Badger (Extreme, Tribe of Judah)
 Steve Bailey (Bass Extremes)
 Victor Bailey (Weather Report)
 Alec Baillie (Leftöver Crack)
 Harvey Bainbridge (Hawkwind)
 Brian Baker (Minor Threat)
 Ronnie Baker (MFSB, The Trammps, Salsoul Orchestra)
 Carlos Balcells (The Dawn)
 Peter Baltes (Accept)
 Michael Balzary aka Flea (Red Hot Chili Peppers)
 Hugh Banton (Van der Graaf Generator)
 Tony Barber (Buzzcocks)
 Paul Barker (The Blackouts, Ministry, Revolting Cocks, Lard, U.S.S.A.)
 Lou Barlow (Dinosaur Jr.)
 Tom Barney (The Honeydrippers)
 Aston "Family Man" Barrett (Bob Marley and the Wailers)
 Arthur Barrow (Frank Zappa)
 Wilbur Bascomb (Jeff Beck)
 Colin Bass (3 Mustaphas 3, Camel)
 Jens Becker (Grave Digger)
 Walter Becker (Steely Dan)
 Mark Bedford (Madness, Voice of the Beehive)
 Robert Levon Been (Black Rebel Motorcycle Club)
 Garry Gary Beers (INXS)
 Nick Beggs (Kajagoogoo, Iona)
 Andy Bell (Oasis)
 Robert Bell (Kool & the Gang)
 Matt Bellamy (The Jaded Hearts Club)
 Bryan Beller (Steve Vai, Mike Keneally, Dethklok)
 Frank Bello (Anthrax, Helmet)
 Carles Benavent (Paco de Lucía, Chick Corea, Miles Davis)
 Jo Bench (Bolt Thrower)
 Martin Bengtsson (Arch Enemy, Armageddon)
 Max Bennett (L.A. Express, The Wrecking Crew)
 Jay Bentley (Bad Religion)
 Glen Benton (Deicide)
 Stevie Benton (Drowning Pool)
 Jeff Berlin
 Guy Berryman (Coldplay)
 Alonza Bevan (Kula Shaker)
 Davide Biale (Davie504)
 Owen Biddle (The Roots)
 Bob Birch (Elton John)
 Mike Bishop (Gwar, Kepone)
 Matt Bissonette (David Lee Roth, Ringo Starr, Elton John)
 Jonas Björler (At the Gates, The Haunted)
 Bill Black (Elvis Presley)
 Lori Black (Clown Alley, Melvins)
 Morty Black (TNT)
 John Blackburn (The Mescaleros, Skin)
 Jack Blades (Night Ranger, Damn Yankees, Shaw Blades)
 Ron Blair (Tom Petty and the Heartbreakers)
 Johan Blomqvist (Backyard Babies)
 Vicki Blue (The Runaways)
 Bobzilla (Damageplan, Hellyeah)
 Andrew Bodnar (The Rumour, Graham Parker)
 Henry Bogdan (Helmet)
 Tim Bogert (Vanilla Fudge)
 Rachel Bolan (Skid Row, Prunella Scales)
 Trevor Bolder (David Bowie's The Spiders from Mars, Wishbone Ash, Uriah Heep)
 Richard Bona
 Zeta Bosio (Soda Stereo)
 Chris Bostock (JoBoxers, Dave Stewart and the Spiritual Cowboys, Subway Sect)
 Joe Bouchard (Blue Öyster Cult)
 Pierre Bouvier (Reset, Simple Plan)
 Randy Bradbury (Pennywise)
 Shanne Bradley (The Nipple Erectors, The Nips, The Men They Couldn't Hang)
 Jon Brant (Cheap Trick, Siren, Jason & the Scorchers)
 Beverly Breckenridge (Fifth Column, Phono-Comb)
 Andrés Bretel (TK, Madre Matilda, Space Bee, Carlos Salas)
 Dan Briggs (Between the Buried and Me)
 Eric Brittingham (Cinderella)
 Brian Bromberg
 Harvey Brooks (Miles Davis, Bob Dylan, The Doors, Mike Bloomfield)
 David Brown (Santana)
 Mark Brown (Prince and the Revolution)
 Phillipa 'Pip' Brown
 Ray Brown (Oscar Peterson, Ella Fitzgerald, The L.A. Four)
 Rex Brown (Pantera, Down, Rebel Meets Rebel)
 Scott Brown (Trooper)
 Baron Browne (Jean-Luc Ponty, Billy Cobham, Vital Information)
 Chris Brubeck (The Dave Brubeck Quartet)
 Jack Bruce (Cream)
 Bunny Brunel (CAB)
 Stephen "Thundercat" Bruner 
 Bob Brunning (Fleetwood Mac)
 Francis Buchholz (Scorpions)
 Sibyl Buck (The Lonely Astronauts)
 Nicholas Bullen (Napalm Death)
 Oteil Burbridge (The Allman Brothers Band)
 Ian Burden (The Human League)
 Hunter Burgan (AFI)
 Mike Burkett (NOFX)
 Jean-Jacques Burnel (The Stranglers)
 Rob Burns (Nucleus)
 Boz Burrell (King Crimson, Bad Company)
 Heinz Burt (The Tornados)
 Cliff Burton  (Trauma, Metallica)
 Bob Bushnell
 Geezer Butler (Black Sabbath, Heaven and Hell, GZR, Ozzy Osbourne)
 Tim Butler (The Psychedelic Furs, Love Spit Love)
 Tony Butler (Big Country)

C

 Tommy Caldwell (The Marshall Tucker Band)
 John Cale (The Velvet Underground)
 Emperor Magus Caligula (Dark Funeral)
 Juan Calleros (Maná)
 Bernie Calvert (The Hollies)
 Ben Campbell (Zed)
 Richard Campbell (Natalie Cole, Dave Mason, Three Dog Night, Chuck Negron, America)
 Tony Campos (Fear Factory, Ministry, Soulfly, Prong, Static-X)
 Marciano Cantero (Enanitos Verdes)
 Captain Sensible (The Damned)
 Alain Caron (Uzeb)
 Will Carruthers (The Brian Jonestown Massacre, Spacemen 3)
 Julian Casablancas
 Jack Casady (Jefferson Airplane, Hot Tuna)
 Gerald Casale (Devo)
 Ken Casey (Dropkick Murphys)
 Martyn P. Casey (Nick Cave and the Bad Seeds, Grinderman, The Triffids)
 Louis Cennamo
 Michael Cera (Mister Heavenly)
 Peter Cetera (Chicago)
 Les Chadwick (Gerry and the Pacemakers)
 Clive Chaman (Jeff Beck, Brian Auger)
 Justin Chancellor (Tool)
 Chas Chandler (The Animals)
 Tim Chandler (Daniel Amos, The Swirling Eddies, The Choir)
 Chris Chaney (The Panic Channel, Jane's Addiction, Methods of Mayhem)
 Jeremy Chatelain (Jets to Brazil, Helmet)
 Stuart Chatwood (The Tea Party)
 Joe Chemay 
 Chi Cheng (Deftones)
 Tony Choy (Atheist)
 Greg Christian (Testament)
 Don Ciccone (Frankie Valli and The Four Seasons, The Critters)
 Al Cisneros (Sleep, Om)
 Annie Clark
 Mark Clarke (Colosseum, Uriah Heep, Mountain)
 Stanley Clarke (Return to Forever)
 Les Claypool (Primus, Colonel Les Claypool's Fearless Flying Frog Brigade, Oysterhead, Colonel Claypool's Bucket of Bernie Brains, Blind Illusion, The Claypool Lennon Delirium)
 Adam Clayton (U2)
 Jemaine Clement (Flight of the Conchords)
 Rod Clements (Lindisfarne)
 Jim Clench (April Wine, Bachman–Turner Overdrive)
 Bud Cockrell (Pablo Cruise)
 Tommy Cogbill (The Memphis Boys, Muscle Shoals Rhythm Section)
 T. Michael Coleman (Doc Watson)
 Bootsy Collins (James Brown, Parliament-Funkadelic, Bootsy's Rubber Band, Science Faxtion)
 Max Collins (Eve 6, The Sugi Tap)
 Johnny Colt (The Black Crowes, Train)
 Tim Commerford (Rage Against the Machine, Audioslave)
 Van Conner (Screaming Trees)
 Norman Cook (The Housemartins)
 Stu Cook (Creedence Clearwater Revival)
 John Cooper (Skillet)
 Glenn Cornick (Jethro Tull)
 Andy Cousin (All About Eve, The Lucy Nation, The Mission)
 Duncan Coutts (Our Lady Peace)
 Billy Cox (Jimi Hendrix, Band of Gypsys, Charlie Daniels Band)
 Mikey Craig (Culture Club)
 Robbie Crane (Ratt, Vince Neil Band, Adler's Appetite, Love/Hate, Vertex)
 Evan Cranley (Broken Social Scene, Stars)
 Bob Cranshaw (Sonny Rollins)
 Jim Creeggan (Barenaked Ladies)
 Chris Cross (Ultravox)
 Juan Croucier (Dokken, Ratt)
 Sheryl Crow
 Rick Cua
 Sal Cuevas (Fania All-Stars)
 Justin Currie (Del Amitri)
 Steve Currie (T. Rex)
 André Cymone (Prince & the Revolution)
 Holger Czukay (Can)

D

 Patrick Dahlheimer (Live)
 Bob Daisley (Gary Moore)
 Bobby Dall (Poison)
 John Dalton (The Kinks)
 George Daly (The Hangmen)
 Mike Daly (Whiskeytown, Grace Potter and the Nocturnals)
 Paul D'Amour (Tool)
 Sharlee D'Angelo (Mercyful Fate, King Diamond, Arch Enemy)
 Traa Daniels (P.O.D.)
 Rick Danko (The Band)
 Mike D'Antonio (Killswitch Engage)
 Mike Davenport (The Ataris, Versus the World)
 Alan Davey (Hawkwind)
 Stuart David (Belle and Sebastian, Looper)
 Jeremy Davis (Paramore)
 Michael Davis (MC5)
 Steve Davy (Steamhammer)
 John Deacon (Queen)
 Kim Deal (Pixies, The Breeders)
 Mike Dean (Corrosion of Conformity)
 Victoria De Angelis (Måneskin)
 Chuck Deardorf (Jovino Santos-Neto)
 Johan De Farfalla
 Vance DeGeneres (The Cold)
 Matt Deis (CKY, All That Remains)
 Robert DeLeo (Stone Temple Pilots, Army of Anyone)
 Rob De Luca (Spread Eagle, UFO)
 Joey DeMaio (Manowar)
 Jay DeMarcus (Rascal Flatts)
 Michael Dempsey (The Cure, Associates, Levinhurst)
 Carlos Dengler (Interpol)
 Rob Derhak (moe.)
 John DeServio (Black Label Society)
 Dr. Matt Destruction (The Hives)
 Blu DeTiger
 Mark Deutrom (Melvins)
 James Dewar (Robin Trower)
 Mohini Dey
 Paul Di Leo (Nena, Adrenaline Mob, Fozzy)
 Bill "The Buddha" Dickens
 Steve Diggle (Buzzcocks)
 Allie DiMeco (the Naked Brothers Band)
 Mike Dirnt (Green Day, Foxboro Hot Tubs, The Network, The Frustrators, Screeching Weasel)
 Jerry Dixon (Warrant)
 John Doe (X)
 Lawrence Donegan (Lloyd Cole and the Commotions, The Bluebells)
 Lee Dorman (Iron Butterfly, Captain Beyond)
 Gail Ann Dorsey (David Bowie)
 Chip Douglas (The Turtles, The Monkees)
 Dave Dreiwitz (Ween, Instant Death)
 Chris Dreja (The Yardbirds)
 Tim Drummond 
 Uriah Duffy (Whitesnake, Lyrics Born, Christina Aguilera)
 Chuck Dukowski (Black Flag)
 Dennis Dunaway (Alice Cooper)
 Donald "Duck" Dunn (The Bar-Kays, The Mar-Keys, Booker T. & the M.G.'s, The Blues Brothers)
 Trevor Dunn (Mr. Bungle, Fantômas)
Joe Duplantier (Gojira, Cavalera Conspiracy)
 David Dyson (Brainstorm, New Kids on the Block, Pieces of a Dream)

E

 Robin "Graves" Eaglestone (Cradle of Filth)
 Jimmy Earl (The Crusaders, Stanley Clarke, Chick Corea, Pino Daniele, Robben Ford, Cleto and the Cletones)
 Nathan East (Fourplay, Toto, Eric Clapton)
 Kai Eckhardt (Garaj Mahal)
 Leif Edling (Krux)
 Bernard Edwards (Chic)
 John 'Rhino' Edwards (Status Quo)
 Richie Edwards (The Darkness)
 Colin Edwin (Porcupine Tree)
 Steinar Eikum (TNT)
 Mike Elizondo 
 David Ellefson (Megadeth, Avian)
 Atom Ellis (Psychefunkapus, Dieselhed)
 Keith Ellis (The Koobas, Van der Graaf Generator)
 Ben Ely (Regurgitator)
 Shane Embury (Napalm Death)
 Bjorn Englen (Dio Disciples, Soul Sign, Yngwie Malmsteen, Tony MacAlpine, Uli Jon Roth, Quiet Riot, Robin McAuley)
 John Entwistle (The Who)
 Howie Epstein (Tom Petty and the Heartbreakers)
 Chris Eskola
 Roy Estrada (The Mothers of Invention, Little Feat, Captain Beefheart and The Magic Band)
 Deon Estus
 Chris Ethridge (The Flying Burrito Brothers, The Family)
 Ean Evans (Lynyrd Skynyrd)
 Mark Evans (AC/DC)
 Tom Evans (Badfinger)
 Jason Everman (Soundgarden)
 Tobias Exxel (Edguy)

F

 Bob Fairfoull (Idlewild)
 Falco 
 Pete Farndon (The Pretenders)
 Dave Farrell (Linkin Park)
 Sam Farrar (Phantom Planet)
 Chris Feinstein (Ryan Adams & the Cardinals)
 Wilton Felder 
 Nick Feldman (Wang Chung)
 Ricky Fenson (The Rolling Stones, Brian Auger and the Trinity, Steampacket)
 Tracy Ferrie (Stryper)
 Jim Fielder (Buffalo Springfield, Blood, Sweat & Tears)
 Ric Fierabracci (Chick Corea, Frank Gambale, Yanni)
 Jennifer Finch (L7)
 Richard Finch (KC and the Sunshine Band)
 Steve Firth (Embrace)
 Brent Fischer (Clare Fischer, Elvis Schoenberg's Orchestre Surreal)
 Harley Flanagan (Cro-Mags)
 Gary Fletcher (The Blues Band)
 Klaus Flouride (Dead Kennedys)
 Herbie Flowers (Sky, Blue Mink, T. Rex, David Bowie, Elton John, George Harrison, Lou Reed)
 Ben Folds (Majosha)
 Derek Forbes (Simple Minds)
 John Ford (Strawbs, The Monks)
 Maya Ford (The Donnas)
 Scott Ford (The Twilight Singers, The Gutter Twins, Camp Freddy)
 Mo Foster (Cliff Richard, Phil Collins, Frida)
 Murray Foster (Great Big Sea, Moxy Früvous)
 Tom Fowler (Frank Zappa & The Mothers of Invention)
 Jackie Fox (The Runaways)
 Bruce Foxton (The Jam, Stiff Little Fingers)
 Nikolai Fraiture (The Strokes)
 Tony Franklin (The Firm, Blue Murder)
 Andy Fraser (Free, Sharks)
 Freebo (Bonnie Raitt)
 Matt Freeman (Rancid, Operation Ivy)
 Peter Freeman (Jon Hassell)
 Chosei Funahara (Plasmatics)
 Misia Furtak (Très.b)
 Miki Furukawa (Supercar)
 Nick Fyffe (Jamiroquai)

G

 Tim Gaines (Stryper, SinDizzy)
 Noel Gallagher (Oasis)
 Simon Gallup (The Cure)
 Craig Gannon (Aztec Camera, The Bluebells, The Smiths)
 Greg Garbowsky (Jonas Brothers)
 Juan Garcia-Herreros
 Roberto García (WarCry)
 Paul Gardiner (Tubeway Army, Gary Numan)
 Chuck Garric (Alice Cooper)
 Matt Garrison
 Steve Garvey (Buzzcocks)
 Rosko Gee (Can, Traffic)
 Rinus Gerritsen (Golden Earring)
 Maurice Gibb (Bee Gees)
 Melvin Gibbs (Rollins Band)
 John Giblin (Phil Collins, Kate Bush, Peter Gabriel, Simple Minds)
 Brian Gibson (Lightning Bolt)
 Christian Giesler (Kreator)
 Peter Gifford (Midnight Oil)
 Peter Giles (Giles, Giles and Fripp, King Crimson)
 Greg Ginn (Black Flag) Credited as Dale Nixon on My War 
 Chad I Ginsburg (CKY)
 Joe Gittleman (The Mighty Mighty Bosstones, Avoid One Thing, Gang Green)
 John Glascock (Carmen, Jethro Tull)
 Bob Glaub 
 Roger Glover (Deep Purple, Rainbow)
 Nicolas Godin (Air)
 Rodrigo González (Die Ärzte)
 Jimi Goodwin (Doves)
 Debbie Googe (My Bloody Valentine)
 Bruce Gordon (I Mother Earth)
 Kim Gordon (Sonic Youth)
 Martin Gordon (Sparks, Radio Stars, Jet, John's Children)
 Mike Gordon (Phish)
 Billy Gould (Faith No More)
 Graham Gouldman (10cc)
 Kenny Gradney (Little Feat, Delaney & Bonnie)
 Larry Graham (Sly and the Family Stone, Graham Central Station)
 Paul Gray (Eddie and the Hot Rods, The Damned, UFO)
 Paul Gray (Slipknot)
 Ric Grech (Family, Blind Faith, Traffic, Ginger Baker's Air Force)
 Edward Tony Green (The Dramatics, Death Row, G Funk )
 Karl Green (Herman's Hermits)
 Max Green (Escape the Fate)
 Colin Greenwood (Radiohead)
 Billy Greer (Kansas)
 Paolo Gregoletto (Trivium)
 Mark Griffiths (The Shadows, Hank Marvin)
 Nigel Griggs (Split Enz)
 Markus Grosskopf (Helloween)
 Richard Grossman (Divinyls, Hoodoo Gurus)
 Kelly Groucutt (Electric Light Orchestra)
 Craig Gruber (Elf, Rainbow)
 Patrice Guers (Rhapsody of Fire)
 Abel Guier (Gandhi)
 Trey Gunn (King Crimson)
 Rutger Gunnarsson (ABBA)
 Jeremy Guns (Brides of Destruction)
 Steve Gustafson (10,000 Maniacs)

H

 Mikey Hachey (Suburban Legends)
 Kenny Håkansson (The Hellacopters)
 Paige Haley (Orgy)
 Bruce Hall (REO Speedwagon)
 Tom Hamilton (Aerosmith)
 Stuart Hamm (Joe Satriani, Steve Vai, Frank Gambale)
 Didz Hammond (The Cooper Temple Clause, Dirty Pretty Things)
 Fred Hammond (Commissioned)
 Jeffrey Hammond-Hammond (Jethro Tull)
 Steve Hanley (The Fall, The Lovers)
 Kathleen Hanna (Bikini Kill)
 Gerry Hannah (Subhumans)
 Timi Hansen (King Diamond, Mercyful Fate)
 Steve Hansgen (Minor Threat)
 Robert Hardy (Franz Ferdinand)
 Nick Harmer (Death Cab for Cutie)
 Tim Harries (Steeleye Span)
 Jet Harris (The Shadows)
 Steve Harris (Iron Maiden)
 Nigel Harrison (Blondie)
 Douglas Hart (The Jesus and Mary Chain)
 Gordon Haskell (The Fleur de Lys, King Crimson)
 Jimmy Haslip (Yellowjackets, Gino Vannelli)
 John Hassall (The Libertines)
 "Evil" Jared Hasselhoff (Bloodhound Gang)
 Juliana Hatfield (Blake Babies, Some Girls)
 Michel Hatzigeorgiou (Aka Moon)
 Robin Hawkins (The Automatic)
 David Hayes (Southside Johnny and the Asbury Jukes) 
 Heath (X Japan)
 Andrew Heermans (John Cale)
 Will Heggie (Cocteau Twins, Lowlife)
 Brian Helicopter (The Shapes)
 Richard Hell (The Voidoids)
 Jonas Hellborg (Bill Laswell, Shawn Lane, Buckethead)
 Svante Henryson (Yngwie Malmsteen)
 Mike Herrera (MxPx)
 Marko Hietala (Nightwish, Tarot, Sinergy)
 Yutaka Higuchi (Buck-Tick)
 Dusty Hill (ZZ Top)
 Ian Hill (Judas Priest)
 Bones Hillman (Midnight Oil)
 Chris Hillman (The Byrds)
 Mike Hindert (The Bravery)
 Taka Hirose (Feeder)
 Derrick Hodge
 Leroy Hodges (Hi Rhythm Section)
 Colin Hodgkinson (Back Door, Whitesnake)
 Devin Hoff (Good for Cows)
 Annie Holland (Elastica)
 Matt Hollywood (The Brian Jonestown Massacre)
 Georg Hólm (Sigur Rós)
 Calum Hood ( 5 Seconds of Summer)
 
 David Hood (Muscle Shoals Rhythm Section, Traffic)
 Peter Hook (New Order, Monaco, Joy Division)
 Dave Hope (Kansas)
 Hugh Hopper (Soft Machine)
 Mark Hoppus (Blink-182, +44)
 Trevor Horn (The Buggles)
 Vinnie Hornsby (Sevendust)
 Brad Houser (Edie Brickell & New Bohemians)
 Hub (The Roots)
 Mike Huckabee (Capitol Offense)
 Mick Hucknall (Simply Red)
 Jim Hughart
 Glenn Hughes (Deep Purple, Trapeze, Black Sabbath)
 Jimmy Hughes (The Banned, Cowboys International, Original Mirrors, Department S)
 Peter Hughes (The Mountain Goats, DiskothiQ, Nothing Painted Blue)
 Peter Hume (Evermore)
 David Hungate (Toto)
 Carl Hunter (The Farm)
 Ashley Hutchings (Fairport Convention, Steeleye Span, The Albion Band)

I

 Mark Ibold (Pavement)
 John Illsley (Dire Straits)
 Michael Inez (Alice in Chains, Ozzy Osbourne)
 Infernus (Desekrator, Borknagar, Orcustus)
 Ricardo Iorio (V8, Hermética, Almafuerte)
 Jeff Irwin (Griffin House, Cerys Matthews, Mat Kearney, Eliot Morris)
 Fredrik Isaksson (Grave, Therion)
 Marvin Isley (The Isley Brothers)
 Michael Ivins (The Flaming Lips)
 Anders Iwers (Tiamat, Cemetary)
 Peter Iwers (In Flames)

J

 J (Luna Sea)
 David J (Bauhaus)
 Anthony Jackson (Chick Corea, Paul Simon, MFSB, Quincy Jones)
 Eddie Jackson (Queensrÿche)
 Jackie Jackson (Toots and the Maytals)
 Jermaine Jackson (The Jackson 5)
 Lee Jackson (The Nice)
 Randy Jackson (Journey)
 Randy Jackson (The Jacksons)
 Marcel Jacob (Europe, Talisman)
 James Jamerson Sr. (The Funk Brothers)
 James Jamerson Jr. (Teena Marie)
 Alex James (Blur)
 Rick James
 Tony James (Generation X, Sigue Sigue Sputnik)
 Michael Janisch
 Álvaro Jardón (Darna, WarCry)
 Neil Jason (Cyndi Lauper, Dire Straits, Brecker Brothers, Roxy Music, Paul Simon, John Lennon, David Sanborn, Saturday Night Live Band, CBS Orchestra)
 Steve Jay ("Weird Al" Yankovic)
 Jerry Jemmott 
 Darryl Jenifer (Bad Brains)
 Neely Jenkins (Tilly and the Wall, Park Ave.)
 Tom Jenkinson
 Todd Jensen, (Journey)
 Joan Jett (The Runaways, Joan Jett & the Blackhearts)
 Jiro (Glay, The Predators)
 Chris Joannou (Silverchair)
 Phil Joel (Newsboys)
 Prakash John
 Alphonso Johnson (Weather Report, Santana, Phil Collins)
 Gordon Johnson
 Jimmy Johnson
 Louis Johnson (Michael Jackson, Quincy Jones, The Brothers Johnson)
 Rick Johnson (Mustard Plug, Bomb the Music Industry!)
 Bruce Johnston (The Beach Boys)
 James Johnston
 Darryl Jones (The Rolling Stones)
 John Paul Jones (Led Zeppelin, Them Crooked Vultures)
 Percy Jones (Brand X, Melon)
 Richard Jones (The Feeling, Sophie Ellis Bextor)
 Richard Jones (Stereophonics)
 Simon Jones (The Verve, The Shining)
 Steve Jones (Sex Pistols)
 Tyler Joseph (Twenty One Pilots)
 Eric Judy (Modest Mouse)
 Ju-ken (Gackt, Anna Tsuchiya, Vamps)
 Larry Junstrom (Lynyrd Skynyrd, 38 Special)

K

 Young K (Day6) 
 John Kahn (Jerry Garcia Band)
 Jari Kainulainen (Stratovarius)
 Jim Kale (The Guess Who)
 Kalma (Lordi)
 Tony Kanal (No Doubt)
 Arthur Kane (New York Dolls)
 Mick Karn (Japan)
 Junnosuke Kawaguchi (The Blue Hearts)
 Carol Kaye 
 Dylan Keefe (Marcy Playground)
 Jesse F. Keeler (Death from Above 1979)
 Ace Kefford (The Move)
 Martin Kemp (Spandau Ballet)
 Rick Kemp (Steeleye Span)
 Ben Kenney (Incubus)
 Clare Kenny (Amazulu, Shakespears Sister, Orange Juice, Indigo Girls)
 Andy Kent (You Am I)
 Pierre Kezdy (Naked Raygun, Pegboy, Strike Under)
 Steve Kilbey (The Church)
 Ian "Lemmy" Kilmister (Motörhead)
 Tad Kinchla (Blues Traveler)
 King ov Hell
 Gary King
 Mark King (Level 42)
 Stove King (Mansun)
 Tim Kingsbury (Arcade Fire)
 Karl Kippenberger (Shihad)
 Cris Kirkwood (Meat Puppets)
 Kisaki (Phantasmagoria)
 Jonas Kjellgren (Raubtier)
 Grutle Kjellson (Enslaved)
 Anders Kjølholm (Volbeat)
 Larry Knechtel (The Wrecking Crew)
 Holly Knight (Device)
 Jerry Knight (Raydio, Ollie & Jerry)
 David Knights (Procol Harum)
 Ryota Kohama (One Ok Rock)
 Ivan Kral (Patti Smith)
 Geoff Kresge (Tiger Army, AFI)
 Greg Kriesel (The Offspring)
 Chris Kringel (Æon Spoke)
 Mike Kroeger (Nickelback)
 Bakithi Kumalo (Paul Simon)
 Hansi Kürsch (Blind Guardian)
 Adam Kury (Candlebox, Legs Diamond, The Kings Royal)
 Alexander Kutikov (Mashina Vremeni)
 Brent Kutzle (OneRepublic)

L

 Abraham Laboriel (Garifuna)
 Göran Lagerberg (Tages, Kebnekajse)
 Greg Lake (King Crimson, Emerson, Lake & Palmer)
Olli-Pekka Laine (Mannhai, Barren Earth, Amorphis)
 Joe Lally (Fugazi, Ataxia)
 Adrian Lambert (Biomechanical, DragonForce)
 Alan Lancaster (Status Quo)
 Dirk Lance (Incubus)
 Ronnie Lane (Small Faces, Faces)
 Steve Lang (April Wine, Mashmakhan)
 Chad Larson (The Aquabats)
 Dave LaRue (Dixie Dregs, Steve Morse Band)
 Bill Laswell
 Blackie Lawless (W.A.S.P., New York Dolls)
 Jack Lawrence (The Greenhornes, Blanche, The Raconteurs The Dead Weather)
 Steve Lawson
 Jim Lea (Slade)
 Michael League (Snarky Puppy)
 Frédéric Leclercq (Kreator)
 Bill Lee
 Brett Lee (Six & Out)
 Geddy Lee (Rush)
 Sara Lee (The B-52's, Gang of Four, Indigo Girls)
 Will Lee (The CBS Orchestra)
 Bill Leen (Gin Blossoms)
 Russell Leetch (Editors)
 Brian Leiser (Fun Lovin' Criminals)
 Kelly LeMieux (Goldfinger)
 Paz Lenchantin (A Perfect Circle, Zwan, Pixies)
 Julian Lennon
 Martyn LeNoble (Thelonious Monster, Porno for Pyros, The Cult)
 Michael Lepond (Symphony X)
 Phil Lesh (Grateful Dead)
 Stefan Lessard (Dave Matthews Band)
 John Levén (Europe, Brazen Abbot)
 Jim Leverton (Blodwyn Pig, Caravan, Fat Mattress)
 Tony Levin (King Crimson, John Lennon, Peter Gabriel, Paul Simon, Liquid Tension Experiment)
 Daniel Vee Lewis (World Entertainment War)
 Graham Lewis (Wire)
 Mike Lewis (Lostprophets)
 Tony Lewis (The Outfield)
 Steve "The Gangsta Rabbi" Lieberman
 Dan Lilker (Anthrax, Stormtroopers of Death, Nuclear Assault)
 Peter Lindgren (Opeth, Steel)
 Jenny Lee Lindberg (Warpaint)
 Brian Locking (The Shadows, Marty Wilde)
 John Lodge (The Moody Blues)
 Danny Lohner (Nine Inch Nails)
 Tony Lombardo (Descendents)
 James LoMenzo (Megadeth, Ozzy Osbourne, Black Label Society)
 Peter London (Crashdïet)
 Joe Long (The Four Seasons)
 Alan Longmuir (Bay City Rollers)
 Nick Lowe (Brinsley Schwarz, Rockpile)
 Conrad Lozano (Los Lobos)
 Doug Lubahn (The Doors)
 Matt Lukin (Melvins, Mudhoney)
 Bruce Lynch (Cat Stevens)
 Riker Lynch (R5 (band))
 Phil Lynott (Thin Lizzy)
 Ken Lyons (38 Special, The Lemonheads)

M

 Graham Maby (Joe Jackson, They Might Be Giants, Natalie Merchant)
 Bill MacCormick (Matching Mole)
 James MacDonough (Iced Earth, Megadeth)
 Alick Macheso, (Orchestra Mberikwazvo) 
 Ian MacKaye (The Teen Idles)
 Steve Mackey (Pulp)
 Lawrie MacMillan (Stiltskin, Ray Wilson)
 Mickey Madden (Maroon 5)
 Matt Maginn (Cursive)
 Tony Maimone (Pere Ubu, They Might Be Giants)
 Dan Maines (Clutch)
 Natalie Maines (Dixie Chicks)
 Sean Malone (Cynic, Gordian Knot)
 Olivier Manchion (Ulan Bator, Permanent Fatal Error)
 Roger Manganelli (Less Than Jake)
 Aimee Mann ('Til Tuesday)
 Michael Manring
 Brian Marshall (Creed, Alter Bridge)
 Ryan Martinie (Mudvayne)
 Nick Massi (The Four Seasons)
 Glen Matlock (Sex Pistols)
 Joe B. Mauldin (The Crickets)
 Chris Maurer (Suburban Legends)
 John Maurer (Social Distortion)
 Jim Mayer (Coral Reefer Band)
 Ricky Maymi (The Brian Jonestown Massacre)
 Gerry McAvoy (Rory Gallagher)
 Christian McBride
 Paul McCartney (The Beatles, Wings)
 Jason McCaslin (Sum 41)
 Mark McClelland (Snow Patrol)
 Andy McCluskey (Orchestral Manoeuvres in the Dark)
 Doug McCombs (Tortoise, Eleventh Dream Day)
 Drew McConnell (Babyshambles)
 Tim McCord (Evanescence)
 Danny McCormack (The Wildhearts, The Yo-Yos)
 Jeremy McCoy
 Chris McCusker
 Hugh McDonald (Bon Jovi)
 Ron McGovney (Metallica)
 Paul 'Guigsy' McGuigan (Oasis)
 Tom McGuinness (Manfred Mann, McGuinness Flint)
 Duff McKagan (Guns N' Roses, Velvet Revolver, Loaded, Neurotic Outsiders, Fastbacks)
 Ben McKee (Imagine Dragons)
 Allen McKenzie (FireHouse)
 John McKenzie (Man, Eurythmics, Bob Dylan, The Pretenders)
 Ali McMordie (Stiff Little Fingers)
 John McVie (Fleetwood Mac)
 Randy Meisner (The Eagles, Poco)
 Justin Meldal-Johnsen (Beck)
 Nate Mendel (Sunny Day Real Estate, Foo Fighters)
 Martin Mendez (Opeth)
 Marco Mendoza (Thin Lizzy, Whitesnake)
 Mark Mendoza (Twisted Sister)
 Buwi Meneses (Parokya ni Edgar)
 Dave Meros (Spock's Beard)
 Bryn Merrick (The Damned)
 Robbie Merrill (Godsmack)
 Alan Merrill (The Arrows)
 Mike Merritt (Johnny Copeland)
 Johnny Lee Middleton (Savatage)
 Marcus Miller (Miles Davis, Grover Washington Jr., Bill Withers, Stuff, David Sanborn)
 Mike Mills (R.E.M.)
 Roger Miret (Agnostic Front, Madball)
 Roy Mitchell-Cárdenas (Mutemath)
 Naoshi Mizuta (The Star Onions)
 Gordon Moakes (Bloc Party)
 Thiago Modesto (Quimere)
 Ole Moe (Immortal, Aura Noir)
 A. J. Mogis (Criteria)
 Billy Mohler (Jimmy Chamberlin Complex, The Calling)
 John Mole (Colosseum II, Gary Moore)
 John Monte (M.O.D., Mind Funk, Ministry, Revolting Cocks, Human Waste Project)
 Monk Montgomery
 Craig Montoya (Everclear)
 Bob Moore (The Nashville A-Team)
 R. Stevie Moore
 Tom Morello (Street Sweeper Social Club) 
 Patricia Morrison (The Gun Club, Sisters of Mercy, The Damned)
 Sterling Morrison (The Velvet Underground)
 Rockette Morton (Captain Beefheart and The Magic Band, Mallard)
 Keith Moseley (The String Cheese Incident)
 Peter Mosely (Inspection 12, Yellowcard)
Cordell Mosson (Parliament-Funkadelic )
 Robin Moulder (TCR, Jack Off Jill)
 Colin Moulding (XTC)
 Gary Mounfield (Aka Mani) (The Stone Roses, Primal Scream)
 John Moyer (Disturbed)
 John Munson (Semisonic)
 Derrick Murdock (The Tonight Show with Jay Leno)
 William Murderface (Dethklok)
 Chris Murphy (Sloan)
 Dee Murray (Elton John)
 George Murray (David Bowie)
 John Myung (Dream Theater)

N

 Samer el Nahhal (Lordi)
 Johnette Napolitano (Concrete Blonde)
 Meshell Ndegeocello
 Kim Nekroman (Nekromantix)
 Billy Bass Nelson (Parliament-Funkadelic)
 Gabe Nelson (Cake)
 Ida Kristine Nielsen (Zap Mama, MLTR, 3rdeyegirl, The New Power Generation)
 Les Nemes (Haircut One Hundred)
 Jason Newsted (Flotsam and Jetsam, Voivod, Metallica, Echobrain, Rock Star Supernova, Ozzy Osbourne)
 Murdoc Niccals (Gorillaz)
 Danielle Nicole (Trampled Under Foot)
 Rob "Blasko" Nicholson (Rob Zombie, Ozzy Osbourne)
 Kelly Nickels (L.A. Guns, Faster Pussycat)
 Johan Niemann (Therion, Demonoid)
 Prescott Niles (The Knack)
 Greg Norton (Hüsker Dü)
 Matt Noveskey (Blue October)
 Krist Novoselic (Nirvana, Eyes Adrift)
 Jonathan Noyce (Jethro Tull)

O

 Berry Oakley (The Allman Brothers Band)
 Marty O'Brien (We Are the Fallen)
 Brian "Big Hands" O'Conner (Eagles of Death Metal)
 Shavo Odadjian (System of a Down)
 Bernard Odum (James Brown)
 Tetsuya Ogawa (L'Arc-en-Ciel)
 Tomomi Ogawa (Scandal (Japanese band))
 Patrick O'Hearn (Frank Zappa)
 Mike Oldfield
 Nick Oliveri (Kyuss, The Dwarves, Mondo Generator, Queens of the Stone Age)
 Stefan Olsdal (Placebo)
 Nick O'Malley (Arctic Monkeys)
 Jerry Only (The Misfits)
 Cait O'Riordan (The Pogues)
 Benjamin Orr (The Cars)
 Jackie Orszaczky
 Joe Osborn (The Wrecking Crew, The Nashville A-Team)
 Franc O'Shea
 Mat Osman (Suede)
 Merrill Osmond (The Osmonds)
 Catherine Owen
 Mark Owen (Take That)
 Scott Owen (The Living End)

P

 Mikko Paananen (HIM)
 Sascha Paeth (Luca Turilli's Dreamquest)
 Richard Page (Mr. Mister)
 Pino Palladino (John Mayer Trio, The Who, Phil Collins, The Pussycat Dolls)
 Bruce Palmer (Buffalo Springfield)
 Del Palmer (Kate Bush)
 Dave "Yorkie" Palmer (Space)
 Chuck Panozzo (Styx)
 Horace Panter (The Specials, General Public)
 Felix Pappalardi (Mountain)
 Dave Parsons (Bush, The Partisans, Transvision Vamp)
 Drew Parsons (American Hi-Fi)
 Kenny Passarelli (Barnstorm, Elton John) 
 Jaco Pastorius (Pat Metheny, Weather Report, Joni Mitchell)
 John Patitucci (Chick Corea)
 David Paton (Pilot, The Alan Parsons Project)
 Roger Patterson (Atheist)
 Aaron Pauley (Of Mice & Men)
 Dougie Payne (Travis)
 Joe Payne (Divine Heresy)
 Justin Pearson (The Locust, Some Girls, Head Wound City)
 Bojan Pečar (EKV)
 Mark Peddle
 Wayne Pedzwater (Buddy Rich, Michael Jackson, Blood, Sweat & Tears)
 Dave Pegg (Fairport Convention, Jethro Tull)
 Matt Pegg (Procol Harum)
 Wendy Penney (Bermuda Triangle Band)
 Jesse Peretz (The Lemonheads) 
 George "Chocolate" Perry
 Tom Petersson (Cheap Trick)
 Tracy Pew (The Birthday Party)
 Mauro Pezzente (Godspeed You! Black Emperor)
 Kristen Pfaff (Janitor Joe, Hole)
 Jeff Pilson (Dokken, Foreigner)
 David Piltch (k.d. lang, Joe Henry, Holly Cole)
 Jeff Pinkus (Butthole Surfers)
 Doug Pinnick (King's X)
 Paulo Xisto Pinto Jr. (Sepultura)
 Brian Pittman (Relient K, Inhale Exhale)
 Morris Pleasure (Sideman, Earth, Wind & Fire)
 Pekka Pohjola (Wigwam)
 Ray Pohlman (The Wrecking Crew)
 Jim Pons (The Turtles, The Mothers of Invention)
 Catherine Popper (Ryan Adams & the Cardinals, Grace Potter and the Nocturnals)
 Robert "Pops" Popwell (The Crusaders, The Rascals)
 Mike Porcaro (Toto)
 Lauri Porra (Stratovarius)
 George Porter Jr. (The Meters)
 Tiran Porter (The Doobie Brothers)
 Nic Potter (Van der Graaf Generator)
 Frankie Poullain (The Darkness)
 John Power (The La's)
 Millard Powers (Majosha, Counting Crows)
 Dougie Poynter (McFly)
 Bondan Prakoso
 Guy Pratt (Pink Floyd, David Gilmour, Roxy Music)
 Pino Presti (Mina, Wilson Pickett, Shirley Bassey, Gerry Mulligan, Astor Piazzolla)
 Francis "Rocco" Prestia (Tower of Power)
 Joe Preston (Sunn O))), Thrones, High on Fire, Melvins)
 Rick Price (The Move, ELO, Wizzard)
 Steve Priest (Sweet)
 Prince
 Joe Principe (Rise Against)
 Joe Puerta (Ambrosia, Bruce Hornsby and the Range)
 Norbert Putnam (Muscle Shoals Rhythm Section, Area Code 615, Elvis Presley, The Nashville A-Team)
 Dave "Herr Pubis" Pybus (Cradle of Filth, Anathema)
 Howie Pyro (D Generation, Danzig)

Q

 Pete Quaife (The Kinks)
 Suzi Quatro
 Nate Query (The Decemberists)
 Jesse Quin (Keane)
 Mick Quinn (Supergrass)

R

 Carl Radle (Eric Clapton)
 Will Rahmer (Mortician)
 Chuck Rainey
 C. J. Ramone (The Ramones)
 Dee Dee Ramone (The Ramones)
 Jimmie Randall (Jo Jo Gunne)
 Paul Raven (Killing Joke, Prong, Ministry)
 Brian Ray (Paul McCartney)
 Jozef Ráž (Elán)
 Noel Redding (The Jimi Hendrix Experience)
 Zoran Redžić (Bijelo Dugme)
 Scott Reeder (Kyuss, Unida)
 Greg Reeves 
 Keanu Reeves (Dogstar)
 Tony Reeves (Colosseum, Greenslade)
 Julianne Regan (Gene Loves Jezebel)
 Jonas Renkse (Bloodbath)
 Trent Reznor (Nine Inch Nails)
 Michael Rhodes (The Notorious Cherry Bombs, The Nashville A-Team, The Beach Boys, Grace Potter and the Nocturnals)
 Tim Rice-Oxley (Keane)
 John Rich (Lonestar)
 Jim Richardson (If)
 Matt Riddle (Face to Face)
 Greg Ridley (Humble Pie, Spooky Tooth)
 Oliver Riedel (Rammstein)
 Brian Ritchie (Violent Femmes)
 Tyson Ritter (The All American Rejects)
 Sam Rivers (Limp Bizkit)
 Dan Roberts (Crash Test Dummies)
 Tom Robinson (Tom Robinson Band)
 Johnny Rod (W.A.S.P., King Kobra)
 Steve Rodby (Pat Metheny)
 Jim Rodford (Argent, The Kinks)
 Omar Rodríguez-López (De Facto)
 Kira Roessler (Black Flag)
 Kenny Rogers (Kenny Rogers and The First Edition)
 Marc Rogers (The Philosopher Kings)
 Carmine Rojas (David Bowie, Rod Stewart, Joe Bonamassa)
 Rick Rosas (Neil Young, Etta James)
 Leaton Rose (The Hot Lies, I Killed the Prom Queen)
 Magnus Rosén (HammerFall)
 Lars Rosenberg (Carbonized, Entombed, Serpent)
 Chris Ross (Wolfmother)
 Share Ross (Vixen, Contraband)
 John Rostill (The Shadows)
 Andy Rourke (The Smiths)
 Demis Roussos (Aphrodite's Child)
 Divinity Roxx (Beyoncé, Alicia Keys, Mark Batson, B.o.B., Victor Wooten)
 Robb Royer (Bread)
 Ilan Rubin (The New Regime)
 Mike Rutherford (Genesis, Mike + The Mechanics)
 Kevin Rutmanis (Cows, Melvins, Tomahawk)
 Greg Rzab (Buddy Guy)

S

 Igor Saavedra
 Jeanne Sagan (The Acacia Strain, All That Remains)
 Tetsuo Sakurai (Casiopea)
 Tobias Sammet (Edguy, Avantasia)
 Samoth (Thou Shalt Suffer, Satyricon, Gorgoroth & Zyklon-B)
 Calvin "Fuzzy" Samuel (CSNY, Manassas)
 Ian Samwell (The Drifters)
 Paul Samwell-Smith (The Yardbirds)
 Troy Sanders (Mastodon)
 Mark Sandman (Morphine)
 Max Santos (Aventura)
 Gabe Saporta (Midtown)
 Rudy Sarzo (Quiet Riot, Whitesnake, Ozzy Osbourne, Manic Eden, Dio)
 Louis Satterfield (Chess Records, Earth, Wind & Fire)
 John Baker Saunders (Mad Season)
 Brad Savage (Band from TV)
 Rick Savage (Def Leppard)
 Russ Savakus (Bob Dylan, Van Morrison)
 Taiji Sawada (X Japan)
 Patrick Scales (Klaus Doldinger, Pee Wee Ellis, Chuck Loeb)
 Tony Scalzo (Fastball)
 Mel Schacher (Grand Funk Railroad)
 Jason Scheff (Chicago)
 Jerry Scheff (Elvis Presley, The Doors, The Association)
 Richard Scheufler
 Don Schiff
 Dirk Schlächter (Gamma Ray)
 Adam Schlesinger (Fountains of Wayne, Ivy, Tinted Windows)
 Zander Schloss (The Circle Jerks, The Weirdos)
 Dan Schmid (Cherry Poppin' Daddies, The Visible Men, Black Francis)
 Timothy B. Schmit (Eagles, Poco)
 Dave Schulthise (Dead Milkmen)
 Dave Schools (Widespread Panic)
 Joseph "Lucky" Scott (Curtom Records)
 Derf Scratch (Fear)
 Karl E. H. Seigfried
 Anna Sentina
 Henkka Seppälä (Children of Bodom)
 Steve Severin (Siouxsie and the Banshees)
 Carlo Von Sexron (Queens of the Stone Age, Eagles of Death Metal, Mondo Generator, The Desert Sessions)
 Nick Seymour (Crowded House)
 Robbie Shakespeare (Sly and Robbie, The Revolutionaries, The Aggrovators, Compass Point All Stars)
 Tommy Shannon (Stevie Ray Vaughan, Johnny Winter, Storyville)
 Matt Sharp (Weezer, The Rentals)
 Kim Shattuck (Pixies)
 Snowy Shaw (Dimmu Borgir)
 Billy Sheehan (Niacin, Mr. Big, Steve Vai, David Lee Roth)
 Fran Sheehan (Boston)
 Ben Shepherd (Soundgarden)
 Jeff Sherman (Glass)
 Scott Shiflett (Face to Face, Viva Death, Jackson United)
 Andrew Shives (Fear Factory)
 Natasha Shneider (Eleven)
 Scott Shriner (Weezer)
 Ray Shulman (Gentle Giant)
 Michael Shuman (Queens of the Stone Age)
 Azharlevi Sianturi (Kekal)
 Gene Simmons (Kiss)
 Jeff Simmons (The Mothers of Invention)
 Paul Simonon (The Clash, Havana 3am, The Good, the Bad & the Queen)
 David Wm. Sims (Scratch Acid, The Jesus Lizard)
 Richard Sinclair (Caravan)
 Ryan Sinn (Angels & Airwaves)
 Ken Sinnaeve (Streetheart, Tom Cochrane, Red Rider, Loverboy)
 Nikki Sixx (Mötley Crüe, Brides of Destruction, Sixx:A.M.)
 Muzz Skillings (Living Colour)
 Tim Sköld (Marilyn Manson, KMFDM)
 Captain Sky
 Leland Sklar (Toto, The Section, Lyle Lovett, Jackson Browne, Phil Collins, Genesis, James Taylor)
 Spike Slawson (Swingin' Utters)
 Robert Sledge (Ben Folds Five)
 Jimmie Lee Sloas 
 Phil Small (Cold Chisel)
 Derek Smalls (Spinal Tap)
 Curt Smith (Tears for Fears)
 Fred Smith (Blondie, Television)
 Kenn Smith
 Scott Smith (Loverboy)
 Zach Smith (Pinback)
 Bryce Soderberg (Lifehouse)
 Scott Sorry (Brides of Destruction, The Wildhearts)
 Ville Sorvali (Moonsorrow)
 Esperanza Spalding
 Phil Spalding (Toyah, GTR, Mike Oldfield)
 Joey Spampinato (NRBQ)
 Barry Sparks (Dokken)
 Mark Spicoluk (Avril Lavigne)
 Chris Squire (Yes)
 Adam Stanger (Comes with the Fall)
 Mike Starr (Alice in Chains)
 Doug Stegmeyer (Billy Joel)
 David Steele (The Beat, Fine Young Cannibals)
 Jeffrey Steele (Boy Howdy)
 Michael Steele (The Bangles)
 Peter Steele (Carnivore, Type O Negative)
 Lewie Steinberg (Booker T. & the M.G.'s)
 Sebastian Steinberg (Soul Coughing)
 Dan Stevens (Dead Milkmen)
 Tony Stevens (Foghat, Savoy Brown)
 T. M. Stevens (The Pretenders, The Headhunters)
 Brad Stewart (Fuel)
 Dale Stewart (Seether)
 Stephen Stills (Crosby, Stills, Nash & Young)
 Chris Stillwell (The Greyboy Allstars)
 Sting (The Police)
 Tommy Stinson (The Replacements, Guns N' Roses)
 Mark Stoermer (The Killers)
 Gary Stonadge (Big Audio Dynamite)
 Henry Strzelecki (The Nashville A-Team)
 Björn Strid (Terror 2000)
 Jesper Strömblad (Dimension Zero)
 Byron Stroud (Fear Factory, Strapping Young Lad, Zimmers Hole)
 Dana Strum (Slaughter, Vinnie Vincent Invasion)
 Hamish Stuart (Average White Band, Paul McCartney)
 Neil Stubenhaus (Barbra Streisand, Quincy Jones)
 Daryl Stuermer (Genesis)
 Alex Suarez (Cobra Starship, This Is Ivy League)
 Kasim Sulton (Utopia, Meat Loaf, Joan Jett, The New Cars)
 Sumon
 Sunmi (Wonder Girls)
 Stuart Sutcliffe (The Beatles)
 Magnus Sveningsson (The Cardigans)
 Steve Swallow
 Dan Swanö (Pan.Thy.Monium) 
 Leon Sylvers III (The Sylvers, Dynasty)

T

 Robby Takac (Goo Goo Dolls)
 Billy Talbot (Crazy Horse)
 Garry Tallent (E Street Band)
 Janis Tanaka (L7)
 Pepsi Tate (Tigertailz)
 John Taylor (Duran Duran, Power Station, Neurotic Outsiders)
 Larry Taylor (Canned Heat, The Monkees, Jerry Lee Lewis, John Mayall, Tom Waits)
 Kavyen Temperley (Eskimo Joe)
 Robert Tench (The Gass)
 Gary Thain (Keef Hartley, Uriah Heep)
 Jean-Yves Thériault (Voivod, Coeur Atomique)
 Jeroen Paul Thesseling (Obscura, Pestilence)
 Bruce Thomas (The Attractions)
 Fred Thomas (James Brown)
 Danny Thompson (Pentangle, Richard Thompson)
 Dougie Thomson (Supertramp)
 Phil Thornalley (The Cure, Johnny Hates Jazz)
 Scott Thunes (Frank Zappa, The Waterboys, Andy Prieboy, Fear, Steve Vai)
 Gary Tibbs (Roxy Music, Adam and the Ants, Hazel O'Connor)
 Jan Erik Tiwaz (Borknagar)
 Michael Todd (Coheed and Cambria)
 Peter Tork (The Monkees)
 Devin Townsend (Bent Sea)
 Sisely Treasure (Shiny Toy Guns)
 Iracema Trevisan (Cansei de Ser Sexy)
 Pete Trewavas (Marillion)
 Derrick Tribbett (Dope)
 Robert Trujillo (Infectious Grooves, Suicidal Tendencies, Black Label Society, Ozzy Osbourne, Metallica)
 S. J. Tucker
 Fred Turner (Bachman–Turner Overdrive)
 Martin Turner (Wishbone Ash)

U

 Takeshi Ueda (The Mad Capsule Markets)
 Futoshi Uehara (Maximum the Hormone)
 Chad Urmston (Dispatch)

V

 Kathy Valentine (The Go-Go's)
 Ross Valory (Journey, Steve Miller Band)
 Eddie Van Halen (Van Halen, Sammy Hagar)
 Wolfgang Van Halen (Van Halen)
 Larry Van Kriedt (AC/DC)
 Sami Vänskä (Nightwish)
 Gerald Veasley
 Jayen Varma
 Ken Vasoli (The Starting Line)
 Sergio Vega (Deftones)
 Morten Veland (Sirenia)
 D. D. Verni (Overkill)
 Sid Vicious (Sex Pistols)
 Varg "Count Grishnackh" Vikernes (Burzum, Mayhem)
 Rico Villasenor (downset.)
 David Vincent (Morbid Angel)
 Phil Volk (Paul Revere & the Raiders)
 Eerie Von (Samhain, Danzig)
 Klaus Voormann (Manfred Mann, Plastic Ono Band)
 ICS Vortex (Dimmu Borgir)

W

 Matt Wachter (Thirty Seconds to Mars, Angels & Airwaves)
 Greg T. Walker (Lynyrd Skynyrd, Blackfoot)
 Johnny "Big Moose" Walker
 Jon Walker (Panic! at the Disco, The Young Veins)
 Scott Walker (The Walker Brothers)
 Algy Ward (The Damned)
 Dennis Ward (Pink Cream 69)
 Tim Ward (The Fall of Troy)
 John Warne (Relient K, Guerilla Rodeo)
 Andy Warren (The Monochrome Set)
 Jared Warren (Karp, Big Business, Melvins)
 Clint Warwick (The Moody Blues)
 Don Was (Was (Not Was), The B-52's, Bob Dylan, The Rolling Stones)
 Freddie Washington (Patrice Rushen), (Steely Dan)
 Roger Waters (Pink Floyd)
 Frank Watkins (Gorgoroth)
 Mike Watt (The Minutemen, Firehose, The Stooges)
 Norman Watt-Roy (The Blockheads)
 Nathan Watts (Stevie Wonder)
 Peter Watts (Mott the Hoople)
 Mikey Way (My Chemical Romance, Electric Century)
 Paul Webb (Talk Talk, .O.rang)
 Alex Webster (Cannibal Corpse)
 Dallon Weekes (Panic! at the Disco, The Brobecks, I Dont Know How But They Found Me)
 Willie Weeks (Stevie Wonder, George Harrison, Eric Clapton, David Bowie, Donny Hathaway, Vince Gill, Wynonna Judd)
 Danny Weinkauf (They Might Be Giants)
 Andrew Weiss (Ween, Gone, Rollins Band, Regressive Aid)
 Mikey Welsh (Weezer)
 Pete Wentz (Fall Out Boy)
 Wess
 Bob Weston (Shellac)
 John Wetton (King Crimson, UK, Asia)
 Tina Weymouth (Talking Heads, Tom Tom Club)
 Ken Whaley (Help Yourself, Ducks Deluxe, Man}
 Chris White (The Zombies)
 Jeordie White (Marilyn Manson, A Perfect Circle, Nine Inch Nails)
 Verdine White (Earth, Wind & Fire)
 Nick Wiggins (Aiden)
 Tal Wilkenfeld (Jeff Beck, Keith Urban, Jackson Browne, Toto)
 Leon Wilkeson (Lynyrd Skynyrd)
 Cliff Williams (AC/DC)
 Hank Williams III (Superjoint Ritual)
 Lamar Williams (The Allman Brothers Band)
 Leo Williams (Big Audio Dynamite, Dreadzone, Carbon/Silicon)
 Trevor Williams (Audience, Jonathan Kelly's Outside)
 Edgar Willis (Ray Charles)
 Gary Willis (Tribal Tech)
 Matt Willis (Busted)
 Brian Wilson (The Beach Boys)
 Eric Wilson (Sublime, Sublime with Rome, Long Beach Dub Allstars)
 Liam Wilson (The Dillinger Escape Plan)
 Mark Wilson (Jet)
 Paul Wilson (Snow Patrol)
 Doug Wimbish (The Sugarhill Gang, Living Colour, Tackhead, Mick Jagger, Joe Satriani)
 Kip Winger (Alice Cooper, Winger)
 Muff Winwood (The Spencer Davis Group)
 Steve Winwood (The Spencer Davis Group, Traffic, Go, Blind Faith)
 Nicky Wire (Manic Street Preachers)
 Jason Wisdom (Becoming the Archetype)
 Jah Wobble (Public Image Ltd)
 Anka Wolbert (Clan of Xymox/Xymox)
 Tom "T-Bone" Wolk (Hall & Oates, Billy Joel, Carly Simon)
 Chris Wolstenholme (Muse)
 Harry Womack (The Valentinos) (Bobby Womack)
 Steve Wong (Beyond)
 Chris Wood (Medeski Martin & Wood)
 Craig Wood (Avril Lavigne, Gob)
 Stuart Wood (Bay City Rollers)
 Allen Woody (The Allman Brothers Band, Gov't Mule)
 Victor Wooten (Béla Fleck and the Flecktones, Bass Extremes, Vital Tech Tones)
 Glenn Worf (Mark Knopfler) 
 D'arcy Wretzky (The Smashing Pumpkins)
 Chuck Wright (Giuffria, Quiet Riot, House of Lords)
 Rob Wright (Nomeansno)
 Tomasz "Orion" Wróblewski (Behemoth)
 Bill Wyman (The Rolling Stones)

Y

 Sami Yaffa (Hanoi Rocks, New York Dolls, Murphy's Law)
 Brian Yale (Matchbox Twenty)
 Takahiro Yamada (Asian Kung-Fu Generation)
 Hiro Yamamoto (Soundgarden, Truly)
 Tetsu Yamauchi (Free, Faces)
 Adam Yauch (Beastie Boys)
 Jennifer York (Rachel Rachel)
 Thom Yorke (Radiohead, Atoms for Peace)
 Jasmine You (Versailles)
 Young K (Day6)
 Sean Yseult (White Zombie)
 Doug Yule (The Velvet Underground)

Z

 Buddy Zabala (Eraserheads, The Dawn, Cambio)
 Stuart Zender (Jamiroquai)
 Regina Zernay (Cowboy Mouth)

See also 
 List of classical guitarists
 List of drummers
 List of jazz guitarists
 List of lead guitarists
 List of rhythm guitarists
 List of slide guitarists
 List of keyboardists

Bass
Bass guitarists